Rose Valley is an unincorporated community in Cowlitz County, Washington, southeast of the city of Kelso. Rose Valley is located south on Old Pacific Highway from exit 36 of Interstate 5, then east on Rose Valley Road. The Rose Valley community is part of the Kelso School District, a K-12 school district of nearly 5,000 students.

Geography
Rose Valley is located at  (46.0976135, -122.8264970).

External links
Kelso School District website

References

Unincorporated communities in Cowlitz County, Washington
Unincorporated communities in Washington (state)